Piotr Balcerowicz is an orientalist, philosopher, professor at University of Warsaw and founder of the Association Education for Peace.

Biography 
He was active in the Federation of Government Secondary School of Torun, created in autumn 1980, occurring against indoctrination in schools, which has also been involved in organizing self-education action.

In 1990 he graduated from the Warsaw University Oriental philology. In 1999 he obtained his Ph.D. from University of Hamburg, where he studied in 1992-1996. Former member of the Science Committee of Orientalist Polish Academy of Sciences. He is a lecturer in the Department of International Relations, Faculty of Humanities and Social Sciences at the University of Social Sciences and Humanities in Warsaw, and a professor at the Faculty of Oriental Studies University of Warsaw. Since 2002, founder and CEO of the Association Education for Peace.

Publications

In Polish 
 2001: Afganistan. Historia-ludzie-polityka (Afghanistan. History-people-politics)
 2003: Dżinizm. Starożytna religia Indii (Jainism. The ancient religion of India)
 2003: Historia klasycznej filozofii indyjskiej. Część pierwsza: początki, nurty analityczne i filozofia przyrody (The history of classical Indian philosophy. Part One: origins, trends analysis and philosophy of nature)

In English 

 2009: Jainism and the definition of religion.

References

External links 
 Website
 List of publications Website

Academic staff of the University of Warsaw
Living people
Year of birth missing (living people)
21st-century Polish philosophers